This is a summary of the electoral history of Jim Bolger, Prime Minister of New Zealand (1990–97), Leader of the National Party (1986–97), and Member of Parliament for  (1972–96) then  (1996–97).

Parliamentary elections

1972 election

1975 election

1978 election

1981 election

1984 election

1987 election

1990 election

1993 election

1996 election

Leadership elections

1981 deputy leadership election
First ballot

Second ballot

1984 deputy leadership election

1984 leadership election

1986 leadership election

Notes

References

Bolger, Jim